When God Was Great is the eleventh and final studio album by the Boston ska punk band the Mighty Mighty Bosstones. It was released in 2021 on Hellcat, the band's only album with the label. The album was co-produced by Hellcat founder and Rancid member Tim Armstrong. The album was preceded by the singles and music videos for "The Final Parade", "I Don't Believe in Anything" and "The Killing of Georgie (Part III)".

Critical reception
AllMusic wrote that "there's a vintage album-era vibe to When God Was Great that feels as if the band have crafted a low-key concept album inspired by their time growing up in Boston, going to punk shows to escape the Catholic constraints of their homes, and, finally, finding a way reclaim the positivity and D.I.Y. activism of their youth in the face of growing awareness of social injustice." The Boston Globe thought that "in 'The Final Parade', they unleash a doozy of a final track, an epic salute to ska featuring members of Rancid, Stiff Little Fingers, Fishbone, the Aquabats, and so, so many others."

Track listing
"Decide" – 2:43
"M O V E" – 3:17
"I Don't Believe in Anything" – 3:46
"Certain Things" – 3:42
"Bruised" – 3:12
"Lonely Boy" – 3:33
"The Killing of Georgie (Part III)" – 4:25
"You Had to Be There" – 3:42
"When God Was Great" – 3:40
"What it Takes" – 3:40
"Long as I Can See the Light" – 2:51
"The Truth Hurts" – 3:36
"It Went Well" – 4:33
"I Don't Want to Be You" – 3:56
"The Final Parade" – 7:57

Personnel
The Mighty Mighty Bosstones
 Dicky Barrett – lead vocals
 Lawrence Katz – guitar, backing vocals 
 Nate Albert - guitar, backing vocals
 Joe Gittleman – bass, backing vocals 
 Joe Sirois – drums
 Tim "Johnny Vegas" Burton – saxophone
 John Goetchius – keyboards
 Chris Rhodes – trombone
 Leon Silva – saxophone, backing vocals
 Ben Carr – Bosstone, backing vocals

Additional vocals and musicians on "The Final Parade"
 Tim Armstrong 
 Aimee Interrupter
 Stranger Cole
 Angelo Moore
 Jake Burns
 Jay Navarro
 Chris Demakes
  Peter "JR" Wasilewski
 Roger Lima
 Jimmy G
 Toby Morse
 Rusty Pistachio
 John Feldmann
 Laila Khan
 Robert Hingley
 Dan Vitale
 Dave McWane
 Karina Denike
 Christian Jacobs
 Jon Pebsworth
 Ted Hutt
 Freddy Cricien
 Steve Jackson
 Glen Marhevka
 Roddy Radiation
 Jesse Bivona
 Justin Bivona
 Kevin Bivona
 Peter Porker
 Fumio Ito
 Gary Bivona
 Bri McWane
 Sirae Richardson
 Erin MacKnezie
 Jesse Wagner
 Felipe Galvan
 Jet Baker
 Heather Augustyn

Charts

References

2021 albums
The Mighty Mighty Bosstones albums